Luke Montebello (born 13 August 1995) is a Maltese professional footballer currently playing for Maltese Premier League side Ħamrun Spartans, where he plays as a forward.

Club career
Having played his youth football for the Birkirkara nursery, Montebello joined Livorno's youth sector in 2011. He had some success with the Italian youth side, before returning to Malta and signing with Valletta on a five-year contract.

Montebello was sent out on loan to Żebbuġ Rangers for the second half of the 2014–15 season in a bid to help them avoid relegation.
 In search of first team football, he joined Tarxien Rainbows in summer 2015 on loan, scoring 12 goals in 31 matches in the Maltese Premier League.

He was again sent out on loan for the 2016–17 season, this time to woodenspoonists Pembroke Athleta.  This was short-lived however, as he was called back to Valletta for the second half of the season, after he injured his shoulder in October. He underwent surgery which turned out to be successful, however he still needed 7 to 8 weeks of recovery.

In 2017, Montebello returned to his childhood club Birkirkara on a permanent deal.

In January 2018, Montebello was banned for match-fixing for one year. After the suspension, he returned to play for Birkirkara again.

International career
Luke Montebello featured in the Malta national under-17 football team and the Malta national under-19 football team. He also featured in the Malta national under-21 football team under Silvio Vella, making his debut on 5 September 2014.

Before an Under-21 match against Czech Republic national under-21 football team, allegedly Montebello was approached to throw the match for a sum of money; he allegedly did not accept and testified against the bribers in court.

He was first included provisionally in the senior side on 4 November 2015. He made his Malta national football team debut under Pietro Ghedin in a 1–3 defeat against Slovakia on 26 March 2017.

Style of play
With a tall and powerful physique, Montebello has been described as a target man.

Honours

Club
Valletta
Maltese Premier League: 2013–14, 2015–16
Maltese FA Trophy: 2013–14

References

External links

1995 births
Living people
People from Pietà, Malta
Association football forwards
Maltese footballers
Maltese expatriate footballers
U.S. Livorno 1915 players
Birkirkara F.C. players
Valletta F.C. players
Żebbuġ Rangers F.C. players
Tarxien Rainbows F.C. players
Pembroke Athleta F.C. players
Balzan F.C. players
Ħamrun Spartans F.C. players
Malta international footballers
Maltese Premier League players
Maltese expatriate sportspeople in Italy
Expatriate footballers in Italy